United Wrestling Coalition (UWC) is an independent wrestling promotion based in New Jersey. As a professional wrestling group, their wrestlers compete for individual and tag team championships. Being professional wrestling championships, these titles are not won via direct competition; they are instead won via a predetermined ending to a match or awarded to a wrestler because of a wrestling angle.

UWC Heavyweight Championship

UWC Tag Team Championship

UWC United States Championship

UWC Television Championship

The UWC Television Championship was a professional wrestling championship in the American independent professional wrestling promotion United Wrestling Coalition. It became an official title on December 3, 2011 when The Ripper defeated Billy Lassiter in the finals of a championship tournament.  The championship is currently retired.  There have been 4 reigns by 4 wrestlers.

Inaugural tournament

Title Lineage

List of combined reigns

UWC Rumble Winner

The UWC  Rumble is an annual professional wrestling battle royal held every year in the American independent professional wrestling promotion United Wrestling Coalition. The winner of the UWC Rumble may challenge for any UWC championship they want, whenever they want. The first UWC Rumble, titled the Browns Mills Rumble, was held June 26, 2010 and was won by Blackhearted Justice (Ryan Blackheart and Justice Garrison). There have been thirteen winners of this event.

Winners

UWC BCC Toys for Tots Championship

The UWC BCC Toys for Tots Championship was a professional wrestling championship in the American independent professional wrestling promotion United Wrestling Coalition. It became an official title on December 4, 2010 when Silly Billy won the first-annual BCC Toys for Tots Rumble.  The championship was retired as the UWC no longer holds the BCC Toys for Tots Rumble.

Title lineage

UWC North American Championship

The United Wrestling Coalition (UWC) North American Championship is a defunct professional wrestling championship in the American independent professional wrestling promotion United Wrestling Coalition.  It became an official title on December 4, 1999 when Section 8 became the first champion.  The title was vacated on December 7, 2002 and retired shortly thereafter.  There have been three reigns by three wrestlers and one vacancy.

Title lineage

List of combined reigns

UWC Ironman Championship

The United Wrestling Coalition (UWC) Ironman Championship is a defunct professional wrestling championship in the American independent professional wrestling promotion United Wrestling Coalition.  It became an official title on July 18, 1998 when Slayer became the first champion.  The title was unified with the UWC Heavyweight Championship on May 15, 1999 and retired shortly thereafter.  There have been four reigns by four wrestlers and two vacancies.

Title lineage

List of combined reigns

UWC Triple Crown Championship
The UWC Triple Crown Championship is an accomplishment in professional wrestling. It is a distinction made to a professional wrestler who has won three specific championships. The three titles feature the UWC Heavyweight Championship, the UWC Tag Team Championship, and one of the following titles: the UWC Television Championship, the UWC United States Championship, the UWC North American Championship, and the UWC Ironman Championship. The first man to complete the UWC Triple Crown Championship was Tommy Force, when he won the UWC Heavyweight Championship on May 13, 1999. Force also accomplished the Triple Crown in the shortest amount of time, having completed the UWC Triple Crown Championship in 271 days.

See also

References

 
Professional wrestling champion lists